INS Nitzachon is a  of the Israeli Navy. She is the fourth ship of her class.

Development and design 

The Sa'ar 6-class corvettes' design will be loosely based on the German , but with engineering changes to accommodate Israeli-built sensors and missiles such as the Barak 8 and the naval Iron Dome system. Elbit Systems has been awarded the contract to design and build the electronic warfare (EW) suites for the ships.

They are armed with an Oto Melara 76 mm main gun, two Typhoon Weapon Stations, 32 vertical launch cells for Barak-8 surface-to-air missiles, 40 cells for the C-Dome point defense system, 16 anti-ship missiles Gabriel V, the EL/M-2248 MF-STAR AESA radar, and two  torpedo launchers. They have hangar space and a platform able to accommodate a medium class SH-60-type helicopter.

Construction and career 
She was launched at German Naval Yards and ThyssenKrupp in Kiel. She will be expected to be commissioned over to Israeli Navy in November 2021.  The ship was delivered to the Israeli Navy in August 2021 and is to be fitted with Israeli weapons and radar in Israel. Her maiden voyage from Kiel to Haifa took 12 days and being the last ship of its class to arrive, she was joined aboard by the Navy’s top officers for the final leg arriving into Haifa on the morning of the 30th of August 2021 in parade formation joined by most of the Israeli Navy’s fleet.

Gallery

References

2019 ships
Sa'ar 6-class corvettes